Darren Lydell Woodard (born September 21, 1989) is an American football cornerback who is currently a free agent. He was signed by the St. Louis Rams as an undrafted free agent in 2013. He played college football for Kilgore College from 2009-10, then played at UTEP. He has also played for the Arizona Cardinals.

High school
Woodard spent his prep career at Brazosport High School, earning three letters. He averaged 10 tackles per game as a senior. Was chosen All-District as a junior and senior and was a three-time All-County selection.

College career

Kilgore College
First-team All-Conference choice at Kilgore College, accumulating 10 pass break-ups and three interceptions in 2010.

UTEP
Played in nine contests and made 12 stops (six solo), recorded two takeaways for 71 yards and also had two pass breakups on the year.

Professional career

St. Louis Rams 
After going undrafted in the 2013 NFL Draft, Woodard was signed by the St. Louis Rams. He was waived on August 31, 2013 during final cuts, but was signed to the practice squad two days later. He was waived a week later to clear a spot on the practice squad for Jonathan Stewart. He was once again signed to the practice squad on October 1, 2013. He was signed to a future contract on December 30, 2013. He was waived during final cuts on August 29, 2014.

Arizona Cardinals 
He was then signed to the Arizona Cardinals practice squad on November 12, 2014. On August 31, 2015, the Cardinals released Woodard.

Ottawa Redblacks 
Woodard signed with the Ottawa Redblacks of the Canadian Football League on February 22, 2016.

References

External links
 UTEP bio
 St. Louis Rams bio
 

1989 births
Living people
American football cornerbacks
UTEP Miners football players
St. Louis Rams players
Arizona Cardinals players